The Ontario Raiders were a lacrosse team based in Hamilton, Ontario playing in the National Lacrosse League (NLL). The 1998 season was the 1st in franchise history.

The Raiders finished in a three-way tie for third in the NLL standings.  However, due to their head to head record against the Rochester Knighthawks and Buffalo Bandits, they were seeded in 5th place, just missing the playoffs.

Regular season

Conference standings

Game log
Reference:

Player stats

Runners (Top 10)

Note: GP = Games played; G = Goals; A = Assists; Pts = Points; LB = Loose Balls; PIM = Penalty minutes

Goaltenders
Note: GP = Games played; MIN = Minutes; W = Wins; L = Losses; GA = Goals against; Sv% = Save percentage; GAA = Goals against average

Awards

Roster

See also
1998 NLL season

References

External links
 

Toronto
Ontario Raiders
Toronto Rock seasons
1998 in Canadian sports